Ramit Singh Sethi is an American entrepreneur and self proclaimed personal finance adviser.  Sethi is the author of the 2009 New York Times Best Seller, I Will Teach You to Be Rich and founder of GrowthLab.com, owner of IWillTeachYouToBeRich.com, and owner and a co-founder of PBworks, a commercial wiki website.

In 2015, Sethi announced the launch of GrowthLab.com, an end-to-end online marketing resource.

Early life and education 
He attended Bella Vista High School in Fair Oaks, CA,. In 2004, he graduated from Stanford University with a Bachelor of Arts (Information & Society) in Science, Technology & Society with a minor in Psychology. In 2005 he received a Master of Arts in sociology (Social Psychology and Interpersonal Processes), also from Stanford.

Personal life 
In 2018, he married Cassandra Campa.

Books 
In 2009, Sethi released I Will Teach You To Be Rich. He re-released an updated version in 2019.

Sethi also has a chapter giving advice in Tim Ferriss' book Tools of Titans.

Philanthropy 
In 2015, Sethi raised over $350,000 for the non-profit Pencils of Promise.

References

External links 
 IWillTeachYoutobeRich.com, Ramit Sethi's blog
 Kimes, Mina (Dec 13, 2011) "Ramit Sethi: "The new finance guru on the block" Fortune
 Lieber, Ron (May 4, 2012). "How to Raise a Financial Wizard". New York Times
 Schifrin, Matt (June 24, 2013). "Ramit Sethi: How To Force Yourself To Go To The Gym" Forbes
 
 

Living people
Stanford University alumni
American people of Indian descent
American businesspeople
American finance and investment writers
American bloggers
1983 births
People from Fair Oaks, California
21st-century American non-fiction writers